Chamisa may refer to:
 Ericameria nauseosa, a shrub species found in western North America (formerly in the genus Chrysothamnus)
 any plant of the genus Chrysothamnus or Ericameria
 Anthodiscus pilosus, a plant species found in Colombia and Peru
 Nelson Chamisa (born 1978), a Zimbabwean politician

See also 
 Chamiza (Atriplex canescens), a shrub species native to the western and mid-western United States
 Chamise (Adenostoma fasciculatum), a shrub species native to California and Baja California